Davari-ye Bala (also Romanized as Dāvarī-ye Bālā; also known as Dāvarī) is a village in Dar Pahn Rural District, Senderk District, Minab County, Hormozgan Province, Iran. At the 2006 census, its population was 290, in 61 families.

References 

Populated places in Minab County